Synnot may refer to:

Anthony Synnot KBE, AO (1922–2001), Admiral in the Royal Australian Navy
Arthur Henry Seton Hart-Synnot, British Army general
David Synnot, Governor of Wexford during the Sack of Wexford by Cromwell
Monckton Synnot (1827–1879), prominent squatter in Victoria, Australia
Sir Walter Synnot (1742–1821), son of Richard Synnot, settled in the parish of Ballymoyer, County Armagh in 1778
Sir Walter Synnot Manifold (1849–1928), Australian politician
Timothy Monckton Synnot DSC, an officer in the Royal Australian Navy
Walter Synnot, prominent Australian Colonial, a son of Sir Walter Synnot

See also
Sinnott